Coronet Blue is an American adventure drama series that ran on CBS from May 29 until September 4, 1967.

It starred Frank Converse as Michael Alden, an amnesiac in search of his identity. Brian Bedford co-starred. The show's 13 episodes were filmed in 1965 and were originally intended to be shown during the 1965–66 television season, but CBS put the show on hiatus when they reversed an earlier decision to cancel the drama Slattery's People.  The network had plans to show Coronet Blue the following year, and CBS head of programming Michael Dann said that, "there still is enormous enthusiasm" for it, but it would take another full year before the network aired it as a summer replacement. It proved moderately popular and developed a cult following. According to Converse, CBS wanted to renew it but by then Converse had signed to do another series for ABC,  N.Y.P.D., which premiered the day after the last airing of Coronet Blue. Due to a number of pre-emptions, only 11 of the 13 episodes were shown during the initial run. The theme song was performed by rhythm and blues singer Lenny Welch.

Plot details
In an introductory sequence in the first episode, Frank Converse's character is aboard a passenger ship docked in New York, and is briefly addressed as "Gigot".  Lured to a secluded spot on deck, he is told by a woman and two men that they know what he is up to, and that he has -- somehow -- betrayed them.  They drug him, strip him of all ID, and dump him in the river.  Sometime later, he manages to pull himself ashore, and the only words he says are "Coronet Blue".  He has no idea of his name, and there are no clues to his identity, as there is no record of anyone with his fingerprints.

Suffering from amnesia, possibly due to the effects of the drug, the mysterious near-drowning victim adopts the name "Michael Alden," a combination of the name of his doctor and the name of the hospital where he was taken to recover.  After checking out of the hospital against medical advice, Alden tries to unravel the mystery using the only clue he has -- by checking out any business or enterprise that is named "Blue Coronet", "Blue Crown", or any other similar name he can think of.  But he soon discovers that there's a more pressing issue ... he has been targeted for assassination by the same mysterious group of killers that dumped him in the river.  Over the remaining episodes "Michael Alden" attempts to discover his identity and the identities of his assailants, who are referred to in one episode as "Greybeards."  Along the way, he discovers that he speaks fluent Spanish and French, but has no idea how or why he learned these languages. He also discovers that he can play the piano and has some martial arts skill. 

During his travels Alden befriends Max Spier (Joe Silver), owner of "The Seeing I", a restaurant where Alden sometimes works washing dishes on a occasional basis.  Alden also meets and makes a friend in Brother Anthony (Brian Bedford), a monk.  Both are recurring characters, and are not seen in every episode.  The Greybeards are even more rarely glimpsed, but the credits identify two recurring Greybeards (seen only fairly fleetingly in two episodes) as Vincent (Robert Burr) and Margaret (Bernice Massi).

The series ended before the solution to the mystery of Michael Alden's identity was revealed, but series creator Larry Cohen later told his biographer:

"The actual secret is that Converse was not really an American at all. He was a Russian who had been trained to appear like an American and was sent to the U.S. as a spy. He belonged to a spy unit called 'Coronet Blue.' He decided to defect, so the Russians tried to kill him before he could give away the identities of the other Soviet agents. And nobody could really identify him because he didn't exist as an American. Coronet Blue was actually an outgrowth of 'The Traitor' episode of The Defenders."

Episodes

Home media 
Kino Lorber released all 13 episodes on DVD on July 18, 2017.

Notes

External links

Coronet Blue at Television Obscurities

1967 American television series debuts
1967 American television series endings
CBS original programming
1960s American drama television series
American adventure television series
Television series by CBS Studios
Television series created by Larry Cohen
English-language television shows
Fiction about amnesia